Billigheim is a municipality in the district of Neckar-Odenwald-Kreis, in Baden-Württemberg, Germany. The town of Billigheim has five local subdivisions: Sulzbach (1803 Inhabitants), Billigheim, Allfeld, Waldmühlbach and Katzental.

History
The first historic mention of Billigheim is in the archives of Würzburg in the year 1000. At that time, a convent was founded there. The convent owned the village until secularization in 1584. At that time, the convent was closed, and the village was given to Kurmainz.

In 1803, along with the entire area, the town was given to the dukes of Leiningen in Baden, who remodeled the convent into a palace. This palace burned to the ground in 1902. The remaining church was remodeled in 1878–79.

In 1806 Billigheim became part of the Grand Duchy of Baden.

Twin towns – sister cities
 Óbuda-Békásmegyer (Budapest), Hungary

Gallery

References

External links

 Official website

Neckar-Odenwald-Kreis